Arqin Bolagh (also Romanized as Arqīn Bolāgh and Ārqīn Bolāgh; also known as Ārām Bulāq and Arghīn Bolāgh) is a village in Zarrineh Rud Rural District, Bizineh Rud District, Khodabandeh County, Zanjan Province, Iran. At the 2006 census, its population was 954, in 204 families.

References 

Populated places in Khodabandeh County